It's a Wonderful Life is an opera by Jake Heggie to a libretto by Gene Scheer based on the 1946 film. The opera premiered at the Houston Grand Opera on December 2, 2016.

Recording
William Burden (George Bailey), Andrea Carroll (Mary Hatch); Houston Grand Opera Orchestra, conductor: Patrick Summers, Pentatone

See also
 List of Christmas operas

References

Operas
2016 operas
Christmas operas
English-language operas
Operas based on films
Operas by Jake Heggie
Operas set in the United States